Archibald Williams may refer to:

 Archibald Hunter Arrington Williams (1842–1895), Democratic U.S. Congressman from North Carolina
 Archibald Williams (judge) (1801–1863), United States federal judge

See also
Archie Williams (disambiguation)